Böhme (also Boehme)  is a German surname.  Notable people with the surname include:

 Andy Böhme (born 1970), German skeleton racer
 Anton Wilhelm Böhme (1673–1722), German Lutheran author and translator
 Brigitte Boehme (born 1940), German judge and president of church administration 
 Erich Böhme (1930–2009), German journalist and television host
 Erwin Böhme (1879–1917), German fighter pilot in World War I
 Franz Böhme (1885–1947), Austrian and German general during World War II
 Franz Magnus Böhme (1827–1898), German musicologist and composer
 Gernot Böhme (1937-2022), German philosopher and author
 Herbert Böhme (1907–1971), German poet
 Herbert A.E. Böhme (1897–1984), German actor
 Horst Böhme (disambiguation), several people with this name
 Horst Wolfgang Böhme (born 1940), German archaeologist
 Ibrahim Böhme (1944–1999), German politician
 Jakob Böhme (1575–1624), Christian mystic
 Jörg Böhme (born 1974), German retired footballer
 Kurt Böhme (1908–1989), German opera singer
 Marcus Böhme (born 1985), German volleyball player
 Margarete Böhme (1867–1939), German writer of the early 20th century
 Oskar Böhme (1870–1938), German composer and trumpeter
 Robert Böhme (born 1981), German footballer
 Rolf Böhme (1934–2019), German politician and mayor
 Wolfgang Böhme (born 1949), East German former handball player
 Kate Atkinson Boehme, American New Thought writer

See also
Böhm

German-language surnames
Ethnonymic surnames